The 2022 Prime Minister Cup was the fifth edition of the Prime Minister One Day Cup, the premier one-day cricket tournament in Nepal. The tournament was contested by teams representing the seven Provinces of Nepal as well as three departmental teams. It began on 30 October 2022 and ended on 12 November 2022. Armed Police Force Club won their second title after defeating defending champions Tribhuwan Army Club in the final.

Squads 
The ten participants were divided into two groups.

Group A

Group B

Points table

Group A 

 The top two teams qualified for the playoffs.Source: ESPNcricinfo

Group B 

 The top two teams qualified for the playoffs.Source: ESPNcricinfo

Playoffs

Semi finals

Final

References

External links 
Series home at ESPNcricinfo

Prime Minister Cup (Nepal)
Prime Minister Cup (Nepal)